Lotanna Nwogbo (born May 30, 1993) is an American-Nigerian basketball player who last played for Donar of the BNXT League.

Early life and high school career 
Born in Atlanta, Nwogbo played for his high school Mount Vernon Presbyterian School. He was named first-team All-Georgia Independent School Association and All-Region after averaging 16 points and 9 rebounds in his senior season.

College career
Nwogbo started his college career with Tulane. In 2013, he transferred to play for Longwood. In his senior season, he averaged 16.4 points and 8.8 rebounds. He was named to the All-Big South Conference First Team.

Professional career
In 2016, Nwogbo started his professional career with Gimnasia Comodoro in the Argentinian Liga Nacional de Básquet (LNB). He averaged 11 points and 5.3 rebounds per game in 23 LNB games.

In the 2019–20 season, he returned to professional basketball when he signed in Turkey with Yeni Mamak Spor. On December 7, 2019, Nwogbo had a career-high 32 points in a 85–80 road loss to  Akhisar.

On July 27, 2021, Nwogbo signed with Dutch club Donar of the BNXT League. He averaged 11.1 points and 5.3 rebounds in the BNXT competition, while missing the second half of the season due to an injury. He won the 2021–22 Dutch Basketball Cup with Donar.

National team career
Nwogbo has played for the Nigeria national basketball team. In 2018, he played in three qualifying games for the 2019 FIBA Basketball World Cup.

Personal 
Lotanna is the son of Nneka and Chris Nwogbo and has two brothers, one being Zimmy who played college basketball for Cedarville University. He majored in kinesiology at Longwood University.

References

1993 births
Living people
American men's basketball players
Básquet Coruña players
Centers (basketball)
Donar (basketball club) players
Longwood Lancers men's basketball players
Nigerian men's basketball players
People from Lithonia, Georgia
Power forwards (basketball)
Tulane Green Wave men's basketball players